The Ministry of Culture and Communication may refer to:

 The Ministry of Culture (France), formerly known as the Ministère de la Culture et de la Communication
 The Ministry of Culture and Communications (Quebec)
 The Ministry of Culture and Communications (Ontario)
 The Ministry of Culture and Communication (Haiti)
 The Ministry of Information, Communication and Culture (Malaysia)
 The Ministry of Culture and Communication (Morocco)